Santa Fe Rides is a 1937 American Western film directed by Bernard B. Ray and starring Bob Custer, Eleanor Stewart and David Sharpe.

Partial cast
 Bob Custer as Santa Fe Evans  
 Eleanor Stewart as Carol Sheldon  
 Ed Cassidy as Mr. Allen  
 David Sharpe as Buddy Sheldon  
 Roger Williams as Carver  
 Slim Whitaker as Henchman Al Jensen  
 Lafe McKee as 'Dad' Sheldon  
 John Elliott as Carlton  
 'Snub' Pollard as Stubby  
 Nelson McDowell as Andy

References

Bibliography
 Pitts, Michael R. Poverty Row Studios, 1929–1940: An Illustrated History of 55 Independent Film Companies, with a Filmography for Each. McFarland & Company, 2005.

External links
 

1937 films
1937 Western (genre) films
American Western (genre) films
Films directed by Bernard B. Ray
Reliable Pictures films
American black-and-white films
1930s English-language films
1930s American films